Frankie Perez (born May 11, 1989) is a mixed martial artist specializing in Brazilian jiu-jitsu who has competed in both the Ultimate Fighting Championship, as well as 
World Series of Fighting.

Originally from Wallington, Perez moved to Howell Township, New Jersey, where he attended Howell High School.

Mixed martial arts record

|-
|Win
|align=center|11–4
|Jerome Mickle 
|Submission (rear-naked choke)
|Ring of Combat 63 
|Jun 08, 2018
|align=center|1
|align=center|3:39
|Atlantic City, New Jersey, United States
|-
|Loss
|align=center|10–4
|Chris Wade
|Decision (unanimous)
|UFC on Fox: Weidman vs. Gastelum
|Jul 22, 2017
|align=center|3
|align=center|5:00
|Long Island, New York, United States
|
|-
|Loss
|align=center|10–3
|Marc Diakiese
|Decision (unanimous)
|UFC Fight Night: Lewis vs. Abdurakhimov 
|Dec 9, 2016
|align=center|3
|align=center|5:00
|Albany, New York, United States
|
|-
|Win
|align=center|10–2
|Sam Stout
|TKO (punches)
|UFC Fight Night: Holloway vs. Oliveira
|Aug 23, 2015
|align=center|1
|align=center|0:54
|Saskatoon, Saskatchewan, Canada
|
|-
|Loss
|align=center|9–2
|Johnny Case
|TKO (punches)
|UFC Fight Night: McGregor vs. Siver
|Jan 18, 2015
|align=center|3
|align=center|1:54
|Boston, Massachusetts, United States
|
|-
|Win
|align=center|9-1
|Tom Marcellino 
|Decision (unanimous)
|World Series of Fighting 13: Moraes vs. Bollinger
|Jun 28, 2014
|align=center|3
|align=center|5:00
|Bethlehem, Pennsylvania, United States
|
|-
|Loss
|align=center|8-1
|Chris Wade
|Decision (split)
|Ring of Combat 48
|May 16, 2014
|align=center|3
|align=center|5:00
|Atlantic City, New Jersey, United States
|
|-
|Win
|align=center|8-0
|Mike Santiago
|Submission (rear-naked choke)
|Ring of Combat 47
|Jan 24, 2014
|align=center|1
|align=center|1:15
|Atlantic City, New Jersey, United States
|
|-
|Win
|align=center|7-0
|Rafael Fagundes Machado
|Submission (rear-naked choke)
|Ring of Combat 46
|Sep 20, 2013
|align=center|1
|align=center|2:20
|Atlantic City, New Jersey, United States
|
|-
|Win
|align=center|6-0
| Adam Townsend 
|Decision (unanimous)
|Ring of Combat 45
|June 14, 2013
|align=center|3
|align=center|4:00
|Atlantic City, New Jersey, United States
|
|-
|Win
|align=center|5-0
|Alfred Walker 
|Submission (arm-triangle choke)
|Ring of Combat 43
|Jan 24, 2013
|align=center|2
|align=center|2:36
|Atlantic City, New Jersey, United States
|
|-
|Win
|align=center|4-0
|Ben Syers 
|TKO (punches)
|Ring of Combat 41
|Jun 15, 2012
|align=center|2
|align=center|1:22
|Atlantic City, New Jersey, United States
|
|-
|Win
|align=center|3-0
|Jeremy Uy
|Decision (unanimous)
|Ring of Combat 39
|Feb 10, 2012
|align=center|2
|align=center|4:00
|Atlantic City, New Jersey, United States
|
|-
|Win
|align=center|2-0
|Allen Cozze
|Submission (guillotine choke)
|Ring of Combat 38
|Nov 18, 2011
|align=center|1
|align=center|1:09
|Atlantic City, New Jersey, United States
|
|-
|Win
|align=center|1-0
|Andre Shuler
|Submission (rear-naked choke)
|Ring of Combat 36
|Jun 17, 2011
|align=center|1
|align=center|2:32
|Atlantic City, New Jersey, United States
|
|-

References

External links
 
 

1989 births
Living people
American male mixed martial artists
Mixed martial artists utilizing Brazilian jiu-jitsu
Howell High School (New Jersey) alumni
Mixed martial artists from New Jersey
People from Howell Township, New Jersey
People from Wallington, New Jersey
Sportspeople from Monmouth County, New Jersey
American practitioners of Brazilian jiu-jitsu
Ultimate Fighting Championship male fighters